Acteoninoidea is an extinct superfamily of fossil sea snails, marine gastropod mollusks in the clade Caenogastropoda.

Taxonomy
Families within the superfamily Acteoninoidea are as follows:
 † Family Acteoninidae
 † Family Anozygidae
 † Family Soleniscidae

References

 
Gastropod superfamilies